Peter Blay is a Ghanaian military officer and was the Chief of Defence Staff of the Ghana Armed Forces. He was appointed by President John Atta Mills in 2009. He handed over to Vice Admiral Matthew Quashie on 28 March 2013.

References

Living people
Ghanaian soldiers
Chiefs of the Defence Staff (Ghana)
Year of birth missing (living people)